On 1 November 2019, a mass shooting occurred at an army post in Ménaka Region, Mali, killing 53 soldiers and a civilian. Islamic State claimed responsibility for the attack.

References

Indelimane attack
Indelimane attack
Indelimane attack
Mali War
Indelimane attack